D'Antona, D'antona, or d'Antona is a surname. Notable people with these names include the following:

Antonino D’Antona (1842 - 1913), Italian doctor
Jamie D'Antona (born 1982), American baseball infielder

See also

Vince Dantona
D'Anton Lynn
D'Antoni

Patronymic surnames